Juraj Čobej (born 7 August 1971 in Stropkov) is a Slovak football goalkeeper who currently plays for FK Beloveža. Juraj Čobej in Partizán Bardejov is an assistant coach and goalkeeping coach also. His last former club was FC Artmedia Petržalka.

Early years
Čobej's first club was Tesla Stropkov but in 1997 he moved to BSC Bardejov. In the summer of 2000 Čobejs joined Artmedia. Initially he struggled and was not a regular first team fixture. As a result, shortly after joining Artmedia he loaned out to Slovan Bratislava where he made five first team appearances.

An Artmedia regular and diagnosis of a brain tumour
In the seasons following Čobej soon became the first choice keeper at Artmedia, however during the 2005–06 season he was forced out of the game for several months after doctors discovered that he had developed a brain tumour. The tumour was successfully treated and he returned to the first team to feature as one of the most important players during the club's famous run which saw them reach the lucrative group stages of the UEFA Champions League in 2005–06.

In 2007 after a number of successful seasons with Artmedia Čobejs lost his place in the starting line up. At the start of the 2008-09 he was fighting to return to the Artmedia first team.

International selection
On 20 May 2006 Čobej played his first and only game for the Slovak national team, featuring for just two minutes.

Away from football
Čobej is married, has two daughters and lives on the outskirts of Bratislava.

Height:	199 cm	
Weight:	85 kg	
Squad Number:	1	
Position:	Goalkeeper	
League starts:	187
CL starts:     12

References

External links
 Profile at Artmedia

1971 births
Living people
People from Stropkov
Sportspeople from the Prešov Region
Slovak footballers
FC Petržalka players
ŠK Slovan Bratislava players
Partizán Bardejov players
Slovakia international footballers
Association football goalkeepers
Slovak Super Liga players